Mattman & Robin is a Swedish songwriting and production duo composed of Mattias Per Larsson and Robin Lennart Fredriksson. They are published by Wolf Cousins, a publishing company administered by Warner Chappell Music.

In 2016, they won a Grammy Award for Album of the Year for their co-production on American singer-songwriter Taylor Swift's fifth studio album 1989.

In 2016 they won the "Grand Prize" at the Denniz Pop Awards.

Discography

References

Songwriting teams
Swedish songwriters
People from Värmland County
Record production duos